Catarina Wentin (1637-1707) was a Swedish (originally German) midwife, official midwife of the royal court. She has been referred to as the most well known midwife in Swedish history.

Wentin was called to Sweden from Germany to deliver the future king Charles XII of Sweden in 1682. On her own initiative, she was given a residence near the royal palace, the title Royal Midwife and a royal dispensation to perform her work in Stockholm under royal protection rather than under the supervision of the medical authorities. Supported by the queen, Ulrika Eleonora of Denmark, she was active also among the poor of the capital. Wentin had great knowledge in medicine and was respected within medical circles. Though she did not publish a book herself, Johan von Hoorn referred to her in his book about midwifery, Den svenska wäl-öfwande Jord-gumman from 1697.

References
  Pia Höjeberg (Swedish): "Jordemor" (Midwife), Carlssons Bokförlag 1991. .

1637 births
1707 deaths
Swedish midwives
17th-century Swedish people
German midwives
Swedish courtiers
People of the Swedish Empire